809 Lundia is a small, binary, V-type asteroid orbiting within the Flora family in the main belt. It is named after Lund Observatory, Sweden.

Characteristics

Lundia orbits within the Flora family. However, its V-type spectrum indicates that it is not genetically related to the Flora family, but rather is probably a fragment (two fragments, if its moon is included) ejected from the surface of 4 Vesta by a large impact in the past. Its orbit lies too far from Vesta for it to actually be a member of the Vesta family. It is not clear how it arrived at an orbit so far from Vesta, but other examples of V-type asteroids orbiting fairly far from their parent body are known. A mechanism of interplay between the Yarkovsky effect and nonlinear secular resonances (primarily involving Jupiter and Saturn) has been proposed.

Binary system
Lightcurve observations in 2005 revealed that Lundia is a binary system of two similarly sized objects orbiting their common centre of gravity. "Lundia" now refers to one of the objects, the other being provisionally designated S/2005 (809) 1. The similarity of size between the two components is suspected because during mutual occultations the brightness drops by a similar amount independently of which component is hidden. Due to the similar size of the primary and secondary the Minor Planet Center lists this as a binary companion.

Assuming an albedo similar to 4 Vesta (around 0.4) suggests that the components are about 7 km across. They orbit each other in a period of 15.4 hours, which roughly indicates that the separation between them is very close: to the order of 10–20 km if typical asteroid albedo and density values are assumed.

References

External links 
 Electronic Telegram No. 239 announcing the binary system (2005 October 1)
 Discovery Circumstances: Numbered Minor Planets (1)-(5000) – Minor Planet Center
 (809) Lundia, datasheet, johnstonsarchive.net
 Asteroids with Satellites, Robert Johnston, johnstonsarchive.net
 Lightcurve showing signature of the binary
 
 

000809
Discoveries by Max Wolf
Named minor planets
000809
000809
19150811